Een or EEN may refer to:

People 
 Andrea Een (born 1947), American musician and educator
 Robert Een (born 1952), American composer and musician

Other uses 
 Een, a village the Netherlands
 Één, a public Dutch-language TV station in Belgium
 Dillant–Hopkins Airport, serving Keene, New Hampshire, United States
 Eastern Educational Television Network, now American Public Television
 Enterprise Europe Network, an information and consultancy network

kk:1 (айрық)
sl:1 (razločitev)
tr:1 (anlam ayrımı)